Cercis canadensis, the eastern redbud, is a large deciduous shrub or small tree, native to eastern North America from southern Michigan south to central Mexico, east to New Mexico. Species thrive as far west as California and as far north as southern Ontario, roughly corresponding to USDA hardiness zone 5b. It is the state tree of Oklahoma.

Description
It generally has a short, often twisted trunk and spreading branches. The bark is dark in color, smooth, later scaly with ridges somewhat apparent, sometimes with maroon patches. The twigs are slender and zigzag, nearly black in color, spotted with lighter lenticels. The winter buds are tiny, rounded and dark red to chestnut in color.

There are cultivars with white flowers. The flowers are pollinated by long-tongued bees such as blueberry bees and carpenter bees. Short-tongued bees cannot reach the nectaries.

 Bark: Red brown, with deep fissures and scaly surface. Branchlets at first lustrous brown, later become darker.
 Wood: Dark reddish brown; heavy, hard, coarse-grained, not strong. Sp. gr., 0.6363; weight of cu. ft. 39.65 lbs.
 Winter buds: Chestnut brown, obtuse, one-eighth inch long.
 Cotyledons oval, flat
 Leaves: Alternate, simple, heart-shaped or broadly ovate, two to five inches long, five to seven-nerved, cordate or truncate at the base, entire, acute. They come out of the bud folded along the line of the midrib, tawny green; when they are full grown they become smooth, dark green above, paler beneath. In autumn they turn bright clear yellow. Petioles slender, terete, enlarged at the base. Stipules caducous.
 Flowers: April, May, before and with the leaves, papilionaceous. Perfect, rose color, borne four to eight together, in fascicles which appear at the axils of the leaves or along the branch and sometimes on the trunk itself.
 Calyx: Dark red, campanulate, oblique, five-toothed, imbricate in bud.
 Corolla: Papilionaceous, petals five, nearly equal, pink or rose color, upper petal the smallest, enclosed in the bud by the wings, and encircled by the broader keel petals.
 Stamens: Ten, inserted in two rows on a thin disk, free, the inner row rather shorter than the others.
 Pistil: Ovary superior, inserted obliquely in the bottom of the calyx tube, stipitate; style fleshy, incurved, tipped with an obtuse stigma.
 Fruit: Legume, slightly stipitate, unequally oblong, acute at each end. Compressed, tipped with the remnants of the style, straight on upper and curved on the lower edge. Two and a half to three inches long, rose color, full grown by midsummer, falls in early winter. Seeds ten to twelve, chestnut brown, one-fourth of an inch long.

Ecological benefits
The leaves are eaten by the caterpillars of some Lepidoptera—for example, Henry's elfin, the redbud leaffolder, the red-humped caterpillar (which can cause extensive defoliation in late summer but generally does no lasting harm to a healthy tree), the fall webworm (also a late-season defoliator), the white flannel moth, the American dagger moth, the grape leaffolder, and the Io moth.

Cultivation
Cercis canadensis is grown in parks and gardens, with several cultivars being available. The cultivars 'Forest Pansy'
and 'Ruby Falls' 
have gained the Royal Horticultural Society's Award of Garden Merit (confirmed 2017). Both are cultivated for their showy purple leaves, which turn brilliant shades of red and orange in the fall (autumn). 'Ruby Falls' is a weeping form.

In the wild, eastern redbud is a frequent native understory tree in mixed forests and hedgerows. It is also much planted as a landscape ornamental plant.

In the United States, this tree is difficult to grow farther west into arid areas west of western Kansas and Colorado, as there is not enough rain. There has been success growing the tree in Columbus, Wisconsin, whose cultivar has become known as the "Columbus strain" and is a seed source for nurseries. Seeds can be made to germinate by first dipping in boiled (99 °C) water for one minute and then sowing in a pot (do not boil the seeds).

Uses

The flowers can be eaten fresh or fried.

In some parts of southern Appalachia, green twigs from the eastern redbud are used as seasoning for wild game such as venison and opossum. Because of this, in these mountain areas the eastern redbud is sometimes known as the spicewood tree.

Native Americans consumed redbud flowers raw or boiled, and ate roasted seeds. Analysis of nutritional components in edible parts of eastern redbud reported that the flower extract contains anthocyanins, green developing seeds contained proanthocyanidin, and linolenic, α-linolenic, oleic and palmitic acids are present in seeds.

References

External links
Cercis canadensis Large format diagnostic photographs and information.
Morton Arboretum tree general description and a list of cultivars
Cercis canadensis images at bioimages.vanderbilt.edu
NCRS: USDA Plants Profile: Cercis canadensis

canadensis
Edible nuts and seeds
Trees of the United States
Trees of Canada
Trees of the Eastern United States
Trees of the Plains-Midwest (United States)
Trees of the South-Central United States
Trees of Ontario
Trees of the Southern United States
Trees of Northeastern Mexico
Trees of Colima
Trees of Hidalgo (state)
Trees of Nuevo León
Trees of San Luis Potosí
Trees of Tamaulipas
Trees of the Southeastern United States
Trees of humid continental climate
Ornamental trees
Garden plants of North America
Least concern plants
Plants used in Native American cuisine
Trees of the Northeastern United States
Plants described in 1753
Taxa named by Carl Linnaeus
Trees of the Great Lakes region (North America)